"Drunk Americans" is a song written by Brandy Clark, Bob DiPiero and Shane McAnally and recorded by American country music artist Toby Keith. It was released in October 2014 as the first single from his album 35 MPH Town.

Content
The song celebrates social unity among American people of various backgrounds who all participate in drinking alcohol. Brandy Clark, one of the song's three writers, told Rolling Stone that "We wanted to write it sort of like a modern day 'Piano Man'... It's like 'When we're in here drinking, who cares what we are outside of this?'"

Critical reception
Taste of Country reviewed the single favorably, saying that "The woozy waltz adds a hint of inclusive social commentary to allow it to stand out from the rest."

Music video
The music video was directed by Michael Salomon and premiered in November 2014.

Chart performance
On the Country Airplay chart dated for November 1, 2014, "Drunk Americans" debuted at number 31. The song was the week's highest debut, and the most added song to country radio playlists that week. The song sold 15,000 downloads in its first week of release.

Year-end charts

References

2014 singles
Toby Keith songs
Songs written by Brandy Clark
Songs written by Bob DiPiero
Songs written by Shane McAnally
Songs about alcohol
Show Dog-Universal Music singles
Music videos directed by Michael Salomon
2014 songs